Biturix pervenosa is a moth of the family Erebidae. It was described by William Trowbridge Merrifield Forbes in 1939. It is found in Panama.

References

Phaegopterina
Moths described in 1939